The City Park Hockey Stadium is a field hockey stadium in Nairobi, Kenya.

The Kenya men's and women's national hockey teams use the stadium for trainings and matches, in preparation for international tournaments.

References

Field hockey venues in Kenya
Sports venues in Kenya
Buildings and structures in Nairobi